Parmeshwari Lal Gupta (P. L. Gupta) (1914 – 2001) was an Indian numismatist who collated previous research on Indian Numismatics in the post-Independence era. 

His collated work was published as 'COINS', a book by the National Book Trust in 1969.

Early life and education
Born on 24 December 1914 in Azamgarh in the erstwhile United Provinces of Agra and Oudh, his education took place at Wesley High School in his hometown. His education was disrupted as he was expelled from his school in 1930 for joining a local political agitation. He turned to Hindi journalism for local newspapers. During this period, he was introduced to the study of Indian Numismatics by an acquaintance, Adv. Rama Shankar Rawat, a local collector of Indian antiquities. He soon pursued a Masters in Ancient Indian History & Culture at the Banaras Hindu University, Varanasi after finishing his Intermediate and B.A. at the same university.

Career in Museums and Numismatics
After completing his Masters at Banaras Hindu University, Gupta worked as an Assistant Curator at the Bharat Kala Bhavan from 1950 till 1954. During this period, he began pursuing his doctoral studies on Punch-marked coins of ancient India under Prof. V. S. Agrawala's guidance. He got his doctorate in the subject based on his thesis in 1960 while working as the Curator of Numismatics at Bombay's Prince of Wales Museum which he joined in 1955 and worked till 1962.
Later, he joined the Patna Museum in 1963 and worked there till 1972. Later, he joined the Indian Institute of Research in Numismatic Studies, Anjaneri, Nasik as its first director in 1980.

In his long career, Dr. P. L. Gupta wrote a number of monographs, books and articles on Indian Numismatics. Some of his prominent books and monographs are listed here:

 Coins (In the series-India-Land & People)
 Amaravati Hoard of Silver Punch-marked Coins.
 Early Coins of Kerala
 Roman Coins from Andhra Pradesh
 Bibliography of Hoards of the Punch-marked Coins of Ancient India
 Punch-marked coins from Andhra Pradesh Government Museum
 Bibliography of Indian Coins (4 vols.)
 Coin Hoards from Maharashtra
 Coin Hoards from Gujarat State
 A Survey of Indian Numismatography
 Coins-Source of Indian History
 Hamare Desh Ke Sikke (In Hindi)
 Puratatva Parichaya (Introduction of Archeology in Hindi)
 Bhartiya Vastu-kala (Introduction to Ancient Indian architectural monuments in Hindi)
 Prachin Bharat ke Pramukha Abhilekha (in Hindi, Epigraphy)
 Gangetic Valley Terracotta Art.
 Patna Museum Catalogue of Antiquities (Edited)
 Gupta Gold Coins in Bharat Kala Bhavan.
 Punch Marked Coins of Ancient India.
 Catalogue of India Coins in British Museum (unpublished)
 Kusana Coins and History
 Paper Money of India
 Coins and History of Medieval India – Papers of Parmeshwari Lal Gupta compiled and ed. Sanjay Garg

References 

1914 births
2001 deaths
Indian numismatists
People from Azamgarh
Banaras Hindu University alumni